Beretta may refer to:

Beretta, or Fabbrica d'Armi Pietro Beretta, privately held Italian firearms manufacturing company operating in several countries 
Beretta (surname), people with the surname
Chevrolet Beretta, front-wheel-drive coupé produced by Chevrolet from 1987 to 1996
Beretta (wrestler), American professional wrestler Gregory Marasciulo

See also
Berreta (band), French rap band made up of Kalash l'Afro, Sheir, Skwal and Belek (1999-2005)
Biretta, a type of cap
Baretta, an American television show from the 1970s
Bereta (disambiguation)